Kristine Kunce and Corina Morariu were the defending champions but only Kunce competed that year with Nicole Pratt.

Kunce and Pratt lost in the quarterfinals to Rika Hiraki and Aleksandra Olsza.

Els Callens and Julie Halard-Decugis won in the final 3–6, 6–2, 6–2 against Hiraki and Olsza.

Seeds
Champion seeds are indicated in bold text while text in italics indicates the round in which those seeds were eliminated.

 Els Callens /  Julie Halard-Decugis (champions)
 Kristine Kunce /  Nicole Pratt (quarterfinals)
 Miho Saeki /  Yuka Yoshida (semifinals)
 Liezel Horn /  Katie Schlukebir (semifinals)

Draw

External links
 1998 Volvo Women's Open Doubles Draw

Doubles
Volvo Women's Open - Doubles
 in women's tennis